Dover F.C. was a football club based in Dover, Kent, England. The club joined the Kent League in 1894, but folded in 1901.  Dover FC was revived a year later, this time as a purely amateur club, and rejoined the Kent League, but folded again in 1909.  In 1920, the club reformed, this time as Dover United FC and played in local leagues but disbanded for the third time in 1933. A further incarnation of the club came under the name Dover FC, began play a year later, and then folded in 1947.

A new semi-professional Dover FC was immediately formed and rejoined the Kent League, going on to win the league championship twice in the 1950s before progressing to the Southern League. Dover won the championship of Division One in 1967. Johnny Ray was the leading scorer with 42 goals in 49 games helping the club to gain promotion to the Premier Division, where the club spent eleven seasons before being relegated.  In 1983 the club folded due to its massive debts.  A new club, Dover Athletic, took over its place in the league and remains active.

Honours
Southern League Division One (Tier 6)
Champions: 1966–67 
Southern League Division One South (Tier 6)
Champions: 1978–79 
Kent League
Champions: 1951–52
Kent League Senior Cup 
Winners (7): 1951–52, 1959–60, 1961–62, 1966–67, 1967–68, 1970–71, 1971–72

Former players

References

External links
Dover Football Club history site

Defunct football clubs in England
Defunct football clubs in Kent
Sport in Dover, Kent
Southern Football League clubs
Southern Counties East Football League
Association football clubs established in the 19th century
Association football clubs disestablished in 1901
Association football clubs disestablished in 1909
Association football clubs established in 1902
Association football clubs disestablished in 1933
Association football clubs established in 1920
Association football clubs established in 1934
Association football clubs disestablished in 1947
Association football clubs disestablished in 1983
Association football clubs established in 1947